Girsby is a hamlet in the East Lindsey district of Lincolnshire, England. It lies in the civil parish of Burgh on Bain. 

In the 1086 Domesday Book Girsby is written as "Grisebi", in the South Riding of Lindsey and the Hundred of Wraggoe. In 1066 Almer was Lord of the Manor, this being transferred in 1086 to William of Verly, with Thomas of Bayeux, archbishop of St Peter's, York, as tenant-in-chief

At the west of Girsby is evidence of a deserted medieval village, with earthworks, hollow ways, ridge and furrow field systems and tofts (homesteads with land).

In 1885 Kelly's Directory noted Girsby Manor and its former owners, the Pisdar and Lister families. By 1885 Lords of the Manor and owners of the whole parish of Burgh on Bain were the trustees of the estate of the late Captain John Wilson Fox JP, the previous resident of Girsby Manor who died in 1882. The Manor was later owned by Captain Fox's son, John St. Vigor Fox, who became High Sheriff of Lincolnshire in 1906. Girsby Manor was demolished in the mid-20th century, but the building's Grade II listed 1905 or 1909 Baroque-style entrance, with sculpted foxes set on gateway pillars, remains.

References

External links

Hamlets in Lincolnshire
East Lindsey District